"Blame It on My Youth" is a song recorded by American rock band Blink-182. The song was released on May 8, 2019, through Columbia Records, as the lead single from the band's eighth studio album Nine. The song is an upbeat, nostalgic track that recounts the band's early days. It was written by bassist Mark Hoppus, drummer Travis Barker, and guitarist Matt Skiba, as well as producer Tim Pagnotta, and songwriters Sam Hollander and Matt Malpass. The song debuted with a lyric video featuring renowned graffiti artist Risk.

Background
"Blame It on My Youth" originated from a drum pattern that drummer Travis Barker created that the band and their songwriters took and developed further. The song was produced and co-written by Tim Pagnotta, best known for his work with the Strumbellas, Neon Trees, and Plain White T's. Additional writers credited on the track include Sam Hollander and Matt Malpass. The song was their first release with Columbia Records, with whom they signed for Nine. Lyrically, the song nostalgically recounts the band members' upbringings, and how they came to start a band.

Commercial performance
"Blame It on My Youth" was sent to rock and alternative radio on May 14, 2019. It debuted at number 31 on Billboard Alternative Songs chart, and slightly higher on their Hot Rock Songs chart at number 29. The song was added by over 60 radio stations in its opening week in North America, according to Hits columnist Ted Volk. The song ended up peaking at number nine on Billboard Hot Rock Songs chart at number nine, and at position 11 on its sister ranking, Alternative Airplay.

Release and reception
The band announced the single one day after unveiling their 2019 headlining tour with rapper Lil Wayne; it premiered on May 8, 2019 on all streaming platforms, as well as on radio. Travis Barker also guested on KROQ's Kevin and Bean that morning and discussed the song's origins. It premiered with a lyric video online featuring famed graffiti artist Risk spray-painting the song's lyrics on a wall in a time lapse.

Lake Schatz at Consequence of Sound described the song as bouncy and anthemic, while Claire Shaffer of Rolling Stone said the song "celebrates their continued youthfulness and tendencies toward teenage rebellion." Ali Shutler at NME considered the tune a fearless exploration of a new sound, and reminiscent of "classic Blink." 

Despite positive reviews from critics, "Blame It on My Youth" was poorly received by a large number of fans. Hoppus said that these reactions confused him, as he considered it "the most obvious Blink-182 song on the whole record," while Skiba thought it was funny that some fans thought it was a prank. In response to the feedback, Hoppus said "I can't try and write a song to hit a moving target of what I think people are going to expect Blink is or should be or what they want Blink to be... And we've never sat down with the intent of 'Let's write a radio single' because what is a radio single? I don't know what works with radio. I can't write a song for the radio." Hollander later wrote in his 2022 memoir 21-Hit Wonder: Flopping My Way to the Top of the Charts that the tune was "crucified by a portion of their fanbase. They wanted to try something new artistically and were willing to take the hate for it."

Track listing
 Digital download
 "Blame It on My Youth" – 3:06

Personnel
Blink-182
 Mark Hoppus – vocals, bass guitar, songwriting
 Matt Skiba – vocals, guitars, songwriting
 Travis Barker – drums, percussion, songwriting

Production
 Tim Pagnotta – producer, songwriting
 Sam Hollander – songwriting
 Ian Walsh – programmer
 Matt Malpass – songwriting, engineer, miscellaneous production
 Brian Phillips – programmer, engineer, miscellaneous production
 Manny Marroquin – mixing
 Chris Galland – mixing
 Robin Florent – assistant engineer
 Scott Desmarais – assistant engineer
 Chris Athens – mastering engineer

Charts

Weekly charts

Year-end charts

Release history

References

2019 singles
2019 songs
Blink-182 songs
Songs written by Mark Hoppus
Songs written by Matt Skiba
Songs written by Travis Barker
Songs written by Tim Pagnotta
Songs written by Sam Hollander